Charles Wolfe (1791–1823) was an Irish poet.

Charles Wolfe may also refer to:
Charles Wolfe (wrestler)
Charles D. Wolfe, mayor of Williamsport, Pennsylvania, 1908–1911
Charlie Wolfe (1892–1966), Australian rules footballer who played with South Melbourne
Charles Wolfe (musicologist), in the International Bluegrass Music Hall of Fame
Charlie Wolfe, musician on We Are All One

See also
Chuck Wolfe (disambiguation)
Charles Wolf (disambiguation)